Caliphate Day or Khilafat Day (Urdu: Yaum-e-Khilafat) is commemorated annually on 27 May by members of the Ahmadiyya Muslim Community in remembrance of the significance of the system of spiritual leadership within the community known as Khilafat. The current Khalifa is Mirza Masroor Ahmad, the 5th in line of successors of Mirza Ghulam Ahmad whom the Ahmadis consider the Promised Messiah.

References

  

Ahmadiyya events
May observances
Islamic terminology